Shō Jun may refer to:
Shō Jun (1660-1706) (尚 純), son of King Shō Tei of the Ryūkyū Kingdom
Shō Jun (1873-1945) (尚 順), son of King Shō Tai of the Ryūkyū Kingdom